Andhra Medical College is in Visakhapatnam, Andhra Pradesh, India, and affiliated to NTR University of Health Sciences. It is the oldest medical college in Andhra Pradesh, and the sixth oldest in India. It is recognized by the Medical Council of India. Dr. P. Shyam Prasad is the present vice chancellor.

Emblem 
Andhra Medical College emblem was designed by Dr. F. J. Anderson, the first principal.

Renovation 

In the year 2020, Dr Sudhakar, principal, Andhra Medical College (AMC), had disclosed the modernisation plan for the hospital. A plan is being designed to have vertical buildings which will accommodate all the departments of the college. A sum of ₹120 crores had been earmarked for this purpose. It is proposed to demolish the Panagal building in the campus and a seven-storey building is planned to be constructed in its place. The building is proposed to accommodate all departments from anatomy to community medicine and even pre-clinical and para-clinical departments.

Principals

Departments 

 Department of Anaesthesiology
 Department of Anatomy: established in 1923. The first Professor was Capt. F. J. Anderson. It has a Museum. There are two artificial human skeletons donated by Dr. R. Krishna Rao. Dr. S. Swaminathan Prize and Dr. Anderson Medal are awarded to meritorious students annually.
 Department of Biochemistry: started in 1925 as part of the Physiology department. Dr. V. K. Narayana Menon was the first professor. Rao Bahadur Dr. V. K. Narayana Menon Medal, Dr. Venkateswarulu Prize, Dr. M. V. V. Krishna Mohan Memorial Prize and Dr C. Sita Devi University Medal awarded annually to meritorious students.
 Department of Cardiology: started in 1971 as a 25-bedded ward with Intensive Care Unit. As a result of public contributions and Costal Andhra Heart Foundation, a separate building was constructed exclusively for the Department of Cardiology in 1981. The department was upgraded to 36-beds and 18-bedded Intensive Cardiac Care Unit. An Intermediate Coronary Care Unit was opened in the year 2001.
 Department of Cardiothoracic Surgery: started in 1956 with Dr. B. Sundara Rama Murthy as the first professor. An open heart surgery Unit was recently inaugurated on the second floor of the Cardiology Block with financial assistance from the Visakhapatnam Steel Plant and the Coastal Heart Foundation.
 Department of Dental Surgery
 Department of Dermatology
 Department of Endocrinology
 Department of Forensic Medicine
 Department of Gastroenterology
 Department of General Surgery
 Department of Medicine: set up at the King George Hospital and upgraded in 1923. The acute medical care unit runs 24 hours. Dr. W. C. Gray was the first professor and head. Jeypore Sri Vikram Deo Varma Medal, Vemuri Sivaji Rao Medal and Dr. P. Kutumbaiah prizes are awarded annually.
 Department of Microbiology
 Department of Nephrology: established by T. Ravi Raju, who has been instrumental in developing the Kidney transplantation facility in the hospital.
 Department of Neurology
 Department of Neurosurgery: started in 1956. It is the first neurosurgical unit of the united Andhra Pradesh. Dr. S. Balaparameswara Rao was its first professor and head of the department. An exclusive unit of 'Head Injury and Intensive Care' was started in 1991. Superspeciality course (M.Ch.) was started in 1986.
 Department of Nuclear Medicine
 Department of Obstetrics and Gynaecology
 Department of Ophthalmology
 Department of Orthopaedics: set up in 1964 with Dr. C. Vyaghreswarudu as the head of department. An artificial limb center was set up in 1983.
 Department of Otorhinolaryngology
 Department of Paediatric Surgery
 Department of Paediatrics
 Department of Pathology: started in 1923. Dr. T. S. Tirumurti was its first professor. Postgraduate courses were started in 1946. It was upgraded in 1953. The Cytology wing was started in 1996. Dr. T. Bhaskara Menon Memorial prize and Dr. Tatachari medal is annually awarded to meritorious students.
 Department of Pharmacology
 Department of Physiology
 Department of Plastic Surgery
 Department of Psychiatry
 Department of Radiology
 Department of Radiotherapy
 Department of Sexually Transmitted Diseases
 Department of Community Medicine: The Department of Hygiene and Bacteriology was established in 1925. Dr. C. Rama Murty was its first professor. It was renamed as Department of Social and Preventive Medicine in 1955 and now called Department of Community Medicine. The department gives out Silver Jubilee Celebration Committee Prize and Endowment Medal, Dr. Sonti Dakshinamurthy Prize and Dr. Vallabha Sastry Prize every year.
 Department of Tuberculosis and Chest Diseases
 Department of Urology

Library 
Andhra Medical College Central library was established in 1930. By 1987, the library had a collection of 32,000 books and 107 journals.

Recently an independent library building complex was constructed in front of the Panagal building (main building/office) and near the house surgeons and postgraduates men's hostel.

Teaching hospitals 
These Teaching Hospitals are attached with the Andhra Medical College:

King George Hospital
Government Victoria Hospital 
Government Hospital For Mental Care 
Rani Chandramani Devi Government Hospital
Government Hospital for Chest and Communicable Diseases
Government Regional Eye Hospital 
Government ENT Hospital

Hostels 
The Andhra Medical College provides separate hostels for men, women, house-surgeons and postgraduates.

 AMC Women's Hostel was built in 1942. The hostel has a capacity of accommodating 175 students and has a play ground, reading rooms, recreational centre and library.
It was built during the year 1952 with a total of 262 rooms. The hostel has a dining hall, reading room, TV room and recreational centre for indoor games.
 Hostel for House-surgeons and Postgraduates was built in 1965.

The wings of AMC 
The Institutional Ethics Committee
The AMC Research Forum
The Medical Education Cell
Rasamayi
Prakriti 
AURA (AMC Undergraduate Research Association) is a recently established research forum for encouraging the undergraduate students to do research in the field of their choice.

Dr R Rednam Surya Prasada Rao professor of ophthalmology who trained many ophthalmologist is considered teacher per excellence As an honor Government Regional Eye Hospital was named after him.

Dr M Suryanarayana Murthy professor of Ophthalmology was considered as one of the greatest teachers which Andhra Medical College ever produced. His encyclopedic knowledge use to enthrall the students. He was called the "Walking Duke Elder" ho wrote 16 volumes on eye called the system of Ophthalmology.

AMCOSA 
Andhra Medical College Old Student's Association (AMCOSA) was formed by the efforts of Prof. P. Brahmayya Sastry and Dr. C. Vyaghreswarudu. The first AMCOSA day was celebrated on 28 January 1967, which was inaugurated by Lt.Col. Dr. M. V. Ramana Murthy, who was the last Surgeon General of the combined Madras Province.

Notable people 

 T. Prabhakar, first Vice-Chancellor of Uttar Pradesh University of Medical Sciences.
 Hilda Mary Lazarus, Principal of AMC and Superintendent of KGH.
 M. G. Kini, Professor of Orthopedics.
 B. V. Satyanarayana (1927–2005), Professor of Dermatology.
 V. Ramalingaswami (1921–2001), eminent Nutritional Scientist and recipient of Padma Bhushan.
 P. Brahmayya Sastry, Professor of Physiology.
 C. Vyaghreswarudu, Professor of Orthopaedics. Dharma Rao orthopedics
 P. Kutumbaiah, professor of medicine.
 I. Bhooshana Rao, forensic pathologist and academic
 Kakarla Subba Rao, Professor of Radiology and Director, Nizams Institute of Medical Sciences.
 L. Suryanarayana, Professor of Surgery, Principal of AMC and Vice-Chancellor, NTR University of Health Sciences.
 P. Siva Reddy (1920–2005), Professor of Ophthalmology and Director of Sarojini Devi Eye Hospital.
 Ponduri Venkata Ramana Rao (1917–2005), Professor of Microbiology and Director of Institute of Preventive Medicine.
 Sripada Pinakapani, General Physician, Sangeetha Kalanidhi and recipient of Padma Bhushan.
 Sonti Dakshina Murthy (1899–1975), Professor of Social and Preventive Medicine.
 A. Ranganadha Rao, the first urologist of Andhra Pradesh.
 Raman Viswanathan, Chest physician and Padma Bhushan awardee
 Seshagiri Mallampati, anesthesiologist, best known for proposing the eponymous Mallampati score.

References

External links 

 Visakhapatnam Doctors
 Official website (archived 2010)

Medical colleges in Andhra Pradesh
1923 establishments in India
Universities and colleges in Visakhapatnam
Educational institutions established in 1923
Uttarandhra
Academic institutions formerly affiliated with the University of Madras